"Doctor in Distress" is a pop song related to the BBC television programme Doctor Who. It was released as an ensemble charity single in 1985.

Background 
In 1985, when the production of the series was suspended for a year and it looked as if it faced cancellation, a charity single was produced and released in March. It was written by the series' unofficial continuity advisor Ian Levine and freelancer Fiachra Trench, who had previously collaborated on the theme music for the TV pilot K-9 and Company, a Doctor Who spin off from 1981.  When news of the single was announced in early March, it was rumoured that the recording session would include the Village People, together with self-confessed Doctor Who fans Elton John and Holly Johnson.  This, however, did not occur.  Instead, organisers Paul Mark Tams and Jeff Weston (managing director of Record Shack) secured the involvement of 25 mid-level performers, some of which were attached to Weston's label.  The resulting supergroup recorded and released the single under the name Who Cares?, with the participation of four regulars from the TV series: Colin Baker (the Sixth Doctor), Nicola Bryant (companion Peri Brown), Nicholas Courtney (recurring character Brigadier Lethbridge-Stewart) and Anthony Ainley (the Master).

Proceeds from the single went to the charity Cancer Research. The single, which was released on Friday, 15 March 1985, was universally panned.  Even the BBC itself refused to broadcast the song on its radio stations on the grounds of its poor quality.  Levine himself later told The Guardian, "It was an absolute balls-up fiasco. It was pathetic and bad and stupid. It tried to tell the Doctor Who history in an awful high-energy song. It almost ruined me." The single failed to chart in the UK.

An accompanying video was also released.  This was directed by Keith Barnfather of Reeltime Pictures, a film production company that specialised in Doctor Who-related projects including documentaries and spin-off video dramas.  More than two decades later, the video for the single was included as a special feature on Disc Four of The Trial of a Time Lord DVD boxed set. In the documentary Trials & Tribulations included on the same disc, Levine admitted that it had been conceived by John Nathan-Turner's partner Gary Downie "in a drunken moment".

Personnel 
In addition to the four Doctor Who regulars mentioned above, the recording session, and the accompanying video, included the following: 
Earlene Bentley
Faith Brown (comedian)
Miquel Brown
Warren Cann from Ultravox
Hazell Dean
Floid Pearce from Hot Gossip
Bobby G from Bucks Fizz
Jona Lewie
Phyllis Nelson
Richie Pitts from the cast of the stage musical Starlight Express
John Rocca from Freeez
Sally Thomsett (actress)
David Van Day from Dollar
Members of Matt Bianco (Basia Trzetrzelewska and Danny White)
Members of the Moody Blues (Justin Hayward and John Lodge)
Members of Tight Fit (Steven Grant and Julie Harris)
Members of Time UK (Rick Buckler, Ronnie Ball, Fletcher Christian, Jimmy Edwards, Ray Simone and Nick Smith)

References

External links
More in-depth information/review, including lyrics and video.

1985 songs
1985 singles
Doctor Who spin-offs
Music based on Doctor Who
Charity singles
Songs written by Ian Levine
Song recordings produced by Ian Levine
All-star recordings